San Marco (L 9893) is the second ship of the San Giorgio-class landing platform dock of the Italian Navy.

Development and design 

They are included in the Projection Force from the Sea, the amphibious component of the Italian Armed Forces.

Construction and career
San Marco was laid down on 26 March 1985 and launched on 10 October 1987 by Fincantieri at Riva Trigoso. She was commissioned on 14 May 1988. 

In the summer of 2006, the Navy was one of the first to intervene in the Lebanon War. The ships have landed, in the port of Beirut, under the control of the 1st San Marco Regiment, tons of material intended for the population, field kitchens, ambulances, generators for the production of electricity, pneumatic tents, tons of medicines and tons of food. food intended for the non-combatant civilian population made available by the Ministry of Foreign Affairs, the Civil Protection, the Italian Red Cross and the United Nations World Food Program. 

On 16 June 2016, San Marco,  and Stromboli participated in the Flotta Verde exercise as part of the Great Green Fleet initiative.

Gallery

References

== External links ==

1987 ships
San Giorgio-class amphibious transport docks
Ships built by Fincantieri
Ships built in Italy